Barry Takle (born 12 January 1935) is a former Australian rules footballer who played for the Hawthorn Football Club in the Victorian Football League (VFL).

Notes

External links 

Living people
1935 births
Australian rules footballers from New South Wales
Hawthorn Football Club players
Albury Football Club players